Mohd Zaidi Aziz is a Malaysian politician who has served as Member of the Perak State Legislative Assembly (MLA) for Slim since his victory in the 2020 Slim by-election in August 2020 until November 2022. A member of the United Malays National Organisation (UMNO), a ruling Perikatan Nasional- (PN) friendly political party. He was educated at the International Islamic University Malaysia.

Following the death of Mohd. Khusairi Abdul Talib, Zaidi was nominated the Barisan Nasional (BN) candidate for Slim. He faced a challenge from Amir Khusyairi, the candidate of the Party of Homeland's Fighters (PEJUANG) contested as an independent. On 29 August, he was elected the MLA for Slim, defeating the PEJUANG candidate with a majority of 10,945 votes.

He married Juliana Sarip and has 4 children.

Election results

References 

1977 births
Living people
21st-century Malaysian politicians
United Malays National Organisation politicians
International Islamic University Malaysia alumni